Jaguar Gdańsk is a sports club based in Gdańsk, Poland. The club was founded in 2001, with the academy being officially registered on 20 September 2017. The club's main sporting section is football, but also serves areas in judo and fishing.

Football
Since the club was formed in 2001 it has often played in the regional divisions in Poland. Jaguar have had a football team in the IV liga (fifth tier) since 2016, with the team finishing mid-table in their first three seasons. While the team currently have a team in the Polish leagues, the club has stated that the main focus for the club is developing the club through the academy. It has been since this focus on its youth academies the club has seen a growth and progression up the leagues. In 2014 the club was added to the "White and Green Future" program organised by Grupa Lotos and has seen the academies teams growing to cater for nearly 500 boys while also expanding and improving their facilities and being able to provide more training sessions for the children in the academy.

Seasons

Polish Cup records

Honours

Pomeranian Voivodeship Polish Cup:
Winners: 2019–20
Runners-up: 2021–22

IV liga
Runners-up: 2021–22
Third place: 2020–21

Klasa okręgowa
Runners-up: 2013–14

Klasa A
Third place: 2011–12

Klasa B
Winners: 2008–09, 2010–11
Third place: 2007–08

Other sections

Alongside football Jaguar has a section for fishing with the club owning a  fishery. The club also has a section for Judo, with Jaguar providing training sessions in 5 different venues around the city of Gdańsk.

See also 

 Gdańsk Derby
 Sport in Gdańsk

References 

2001 establishments in Poland
Association football clubs established in 2001
Sport in Gdańsk
Football clubs in Pomeranian Voivodeship